Richard Short may refer to:
 Richard Short (military artist), best known for sketches he made of Quebec City, shortly after its capture by British forces
 Richard Short (artist) (1841–1919), Cornish artist
 Richard Short (actor) (born 1975), English actor
 Rick Short (born 1972), baseball player